A Moravian star is an illuminated Advent, Christmas, or Epiphany decoration popular in Germany and in places in Europe and America where there are Moravian congregations, notably the Lehigh Valley of Pennsylvania and the area surrounding Winston-Salem, North Carolina. The stars take their English name from the Moravian Church, originating in Moravia. In Germany, they are known as Herrnhut stars, named after the Moravian Mother Community in Saxony, Germany, where they were first commercially produced.

History
The first Moravian star is known to have originated in the 1830s at the Moravian Boys' School in Niesky, Germany, as a geometry lesson or project. The first mention is of a 110-point star for the 50th anniversary of the Paedagogium (classical school for boys) in Niesky. Around 1880, Peter Verbeek, an alumnus of the school, began making the stars and their instructions available for sale through his bookstore. His son Harry went on to found the Herrnhut Star Factory, which was the main source of stars until World War I. Although heavily damaged at the end of World War II, the Star Factory resumed manufacturing them. Briefly taken over by the government of East Germany in the 1950s, the factory was returned to the Moravian Church-owned Abraham Dürninger Company, which continues to make the stars in Herrnhut.  Other star-making companies and groups have sprung up since then. Some Moravian congregations have congregation members who build and sell the stars as fund raisers.

Cultural importance
The star was soon adopted throughout the Moravian Church as an Advent symbol. At the time, Moravian congregations were inhabited exclusively by Moravians and the church owned and controlled all property. Daily life was centered on their Christian faith and there was no distinction between the secular and the sacred, even in their daily activities. Everything was considered worship. It did not take long for the stars to go from a pastime for children to an occupation for the congregation.

Moravian stars continue to be a popular Advent, Christmas, and Epiphany decoration throughout the world, even in areas without a significant Moravian Church presence. The stars are often seen in Moravian nativity and Christmas village displays as a representation of the Star of Bethlehem. They are properly displayed from the first Sunday in Advent (the fourth Sunday before Christmas) until the Festival of Epiphany (January 6). Large advent stars shine in the dome of the Frauenkirche in Dresden and over the altar of the Thomaskirche in Leipzig. The city of Winston-Salem, North Carolina, which traces its origins to Salem has Moravian origins dating to 1766, uses the Moravian star as their official Christmas street decoration. In addition, a  Moravian star, one of the largest in the world, sits atop the North Tower of Wake Forest Baptist Medical Center during the Advent and Christmas seasons. Another star sits under Wake Forest University's Wait Chapel during the Advent and Christmas seasons as well.

The use of the stars during the Advent, Christmas, and Epiphany seasons is also a tradition in the West Indies, Greenland, Suriname, Labrador, Central America, South and East Africa, Ladakh in India, and in parts of Scandinavia: wherever the Moravian Church has sent missionaries.

Types of stars

The original Moravian star as manufactured in Herrnhut since 1897 exists only in a 26-point form, composed of eighteen square and eight triangular cone-shaped points. The 26th point is missing and used for mounting. This shape is technically known as an augmented rhombicuboctahedron. Each face of the geometric solid in the middle, the rhombicuboctahedron, serves as the base for one of the pyramid augmentations or starburst points. This is the most commonly seen and most widely available form of Christmas star.

Other forms of Christmas star exist, which differ from the original Herrnhut Moravian star. No matter how many points a star has, it has a symmetrical shape based on polyhedra. There are other stars with 20, 32, 50, 62 and 110 points that are commonly hand-made. The variety comes from various ways of forming the polyhedron that provides a base for the points—using an octagonal face instead of a square face, for example. The common original Herrnhut Moravian star becomes a 50-point star when the squares and triangles that normally make up the faces of the polyhedron become octagons and hexagons. This leaves a 4-sided trapezoidal hole in the corners of the faces which is then filled with an irregular four sided point. These 4-sided points form a "starburst" in the midst of an otherwise regular 26-point star.

Froebel stars, which are paper decorations made from four folded strips of paper, are sometimes inaccurately also called Moravian stars, among many other names.

See also
 Barnstar

References

External links
 Make a German Froebel Star Ornament
 Make a Froebel Star
 Make a Moravian Star

Christmas decorations
Christmas in Germany
Traditions of the Moravian Church
Herrnhut
Niesky
Advent
Star symbols